The 2012–13 Philadelphia Flyers season was the Flyers' 46th season in the National Hockey League (NHL). The regular season was reduced from its usual 82 games to 48 due to a lockout. The Flyers missed the Stanley Cup playoffs for the first time since 2007, and only the second time since 1994.

Off-season
The Flyers first roster move of the off-season was trading backup goaltender Sergei Bobrovsky to the Columbus Blue Jackets for three draft picks the afternoon prior to the NHL Entry Draft. The Flyers re-signed Michael Leighton, who had spent most of the previous two seasons playing for the Adirondack Phantoms, the Flyers' American Hockey League affiliate, to a one-year contract on July 1 to replace him. Shortly after day two of the Draft, the Flyers traded James van Riemsdyk to the Toronto Maple Leafs for Luke Schenn, Brayden Schenn's older brother. The trade gave the Flyers their first pair of brothers since Ron and Rich Sutter back in the mid-1980s.

When the free agency period opened on July 1 the Flyers heavily pursued the two most coveted unrestricted free agents on the market, forward Zach Parise of the New Jersey Devils and defenseman Ryan Suter of the Nashville Predators. The Flyers lost out on both as Parise and Suter signed identical 13-year contracts worth $98 million with the Minnesota Wild on July 4. The Flyers had reportedly offered Parise a contract worth a total of $110 million. As the pursuit of Parise and Suter was occurring, the Flyers lost their two biggest unrestricted free agents, Jaromir Jagr and Matt Carle. Jagr signed a one-year contract worth $4.5 million with the Dallas Stars on July 3. He later said the Flyers requested that he wait while they pursued Parise and Suter, but Jagr did not want to wait and signed with the Stars after Dallas promised him a spot on the top line. Carle signed a six-year contract worth $33 million with the Tampa Bay Lightning on July 4. The Flyers most notable unrestricted free agent signings were former Flyer Ruslan Fedotenko to a one-year, $1.75 million contract and defenseman Bruno Gervais to a two-year, $1.65 million contract.

After failing to land Suter or re-sign Carle, the Flyers signed restricted free agent defenseman Shea Weber of the Nashville Predators to a 14-year offer sheet worth $110 million, $68 million of which was a signing bonus, on July 19. The offer sheet was the richest in NHL history in terms of total money, money per season, and length, surpassing the previous offer sheet record set by Thomas Vanek. The Predators, already having lost Weber's defensive partner Suter to Minnesota, matched the offer sheet five days later. Had the Predators declined to match, they would have received the Flyers' next four first-round draft picks as compensation.

In the weeks leading up to the 2012–13 lockout, the Flyers re-signed wingers Wayne Simmonds and Scott Hartnell to six-year contract extensions. Simmonds extension was worth $23.85 million and Hartnell's $28.5 million.

With team captain Chris Pronger unlikely to return as a result of continuing post-concussion syndrome which has placed his playing career in jeopardy, the Flyers named Claude Giroux team captain on January 15 shortly after the lockout ended.

Regular season
The Flyers started the season 0–3–0, the franchise's worst season start in 17 years.

The Flyers did not qualify for the Stanley Cup playoffs for the first time since the 2006–07 season and only the ninth time in team history.

The Flyers were the most penalized team during the regular season, with 184 power-play opportunities against.

Standings

Schedule and results

Regular season

|-  style="background:#fcf;"
| 1 || January 19 || Pittsburgh Penguins || 1–3 || 0–1–0  || 0 || 
|-  style="background:#fcf;"
| 2 || January 20 || @ Buffalo Sabres || 2–5 || 0–2–0 || 0 || 
|-  style="background:#fcf;"
| 3 || January 22 || @ New Jersey Devils || 0–3 || 0–3–0 || 0 || 
|-  style="background:#cfc;"
| 4 || January 24 || New York Rangers || 2–1 || 1–3–0 ||  2 || 
|-  style="background:#cfc;"
| 5 || January 26 || @ Florida Panthers || 7–1 || 2–3–0 || 4 || 
|-  style="background:#fcf;"
| 6 || January 27 || @ Tampa Bay Lightning || 1–5 || 2–4–0 || 4 || 
|-  style="background:#fcf;"
| 7 || January 29 || @ New York Rangers || 1–2 || 2–5–0 || 4 || 
|-

|-  style="background:#fcf;"
| 8 || February 1 || @ Washington Capitals || 2–3 || 2–6–0 || 4 || 
|-  style="background:#cfc;"
| 9 || February 2 || Carolina Hurricanes || 3–5 || 3–6–0 || 6 || 
|-  style="background:#cfc;"
| 10 || February 5 || Tampa Bay Lightning || 2–1 || 4–6–0 || 8 || 
|-  style="background:#ffc;"
| 11 || February 7 || Florida Panthers || 2–3 SO || 4–6–1 || 9 || 
|-  style="background:#cfc;"
| 12 || February 9 || Carolina Hurricanes || 4–3 OT || 5–6–1 || 11 || 
|-  style="background:#fcf;"
| 13 || February 11 || @ Toronto Maple Leafs || 2–5 || 5–7–1 || 11 || 
|-  style="background:#cfc;"
| 14 || February 12 || @ Winnipeg Jets || 3–2 || 6–7–1 || 13 || 
|-  style="background:#fcf;"
| 15 || February 15 || @ New Jersey Devils || 3–5 || 6–8–1 || 13 || 
|-  style="background:#fcf;"
| 16 || February 16 || @ Montreal Canadiens || 1–4 || 6–9–1 || 13 || 
|-  style="background:#cfc;"
| 17 || February 18 || @ New York Islanders || 7–0 || 7–9–1 || 15 || 
|-  style="background:#cfc;"
| 18 || February 20 || @ Pittsburgh Penguins || 6–5 || 8–9–1 || 17 || 
|-  style="background:#fcf;"
| 19 || February 21 || Florida Panthers || 2–5 || 8–10–1 || 17 || 
|-  style="background:#cfc;"
| 20 || February 23 || Winnipeg Jets || 5–3 || 9–10–1 || 19 || 
|-  style="background:#fcf;"
| 21 || February 25 || Toronto Maple Leafs || 2–4 || 9–11–1 || 19 || 
|-  style="background:#cfc;"
| 22 || February 27 || Washington Capitals || 4–1 || 10–11–1 || 21 || 
|-

|-  style="background:#cfc;"
| 23 || March 2 || Ottawa Senators || 2–1 || 11–11–1 || 23 || 
|-  style="background:#fcf;"
| 24 || March 5 || @ New York Rangers || 2–4 || 11–12–1 || 23 || 
|-  style="background:#fcf;"
| 25 || March 7 || Pittsburgh Penguins || 4–5 || 11–13–1 || 23 || 
|-  style="background:#fcf;"
| 26 || March 9 || @ Boston Bruins || 0–3 || 11–14–1 || 23 || 
|-  style="background:#cfc;"
| 27 || March 10 || Buffalo Sabres || 3–2 || 12–14–1 || 25 || 
|-  style="background:#fcf;"
| 28 || March 13 || @ New Jersey Devils || 2–5 || 12–15–1 ||  25 || 
|-  style="background:#cfc;"
| 29 || March 15 || New Jersey Devils || 2–1 SO || 13–15–1 || 27 || 
|-  style="background:#fcf;"
| 30 || March 18 || @ Tampa Bay Lightning || 2–4 || 13–16–1 || 27 || 
|-  style="background:#ffc;"
| 31 || March 24 || @ Pittsburgh Penguins || 2–1 OT || 13–16–2 || 28 || 
|-  style="background:#fcf;"
| 32 || March 26 || New York Rangers || 2–5  || 13–17–2 || 28  || 
|-  style="background:#ffc;"
| 33 || March 28 || New York Islanders || 3–4 SO || 13–17–3 || 29 || 
|-  style="background:#cfc;"
| 34 || March 30 || Boston Bruins || 3–1 || 14–17–3 || 31 || 
|-  style="background:#cfc;"
| 35 || March 31 || Washington Capitals || 5–4 OT || 15–17–3 || 33 || 
|-

|-  style="background:#cfc;"
| 36 || April 3 || Montreal Canadiens || 3–5 || 16–17–3 || 35 || 
|-  style="background:#cfc;"
| 37 || April 4 || @ Toronto Maple Leafs || 5–3 || 17–17–3 || 37 || 
|- style="background:#fcf;"
| 38 || April 6 || @ Winnipeg Jets || 1–4 || 17–18–3 ||  37 || 
|-  style="background:#fcf;"
| 39 || April 9 || @ New York Islanders || 1–4 || 17–19–3 || 37 || 
|-  style="background:#fcf;"
| 40 || April 11 || Ottawa Senators || 3–1 || 17–20–3 || 37 || 
|-  style="background:#fcf;"
| 41 || April 13 || @ Buffalo Sabres || 0–1 || 17–21–3 || 37 || 
|-  style="background:#cfc;"
| 42 || April 15 || @ Montreal Canadiens || 7–3 || 18–21–3 || 39 || 
|-  style="background:#cfc;"
| 43 || April 16 || New York Rangers || 2–4 || 19–21–3 || 41 || 
|-  style="background:#fcf;"
| 44 || April 18 || New Jersey Devils || 3–0 || 19–22–3 || 41 || 
|-  style="background:#cfc;"
| 45 || April 20 || @ Carolina Hurricanes || 5–3 || 20–22–3  || 43 || 
|-  style="background:#cfc;"
| 46 || April 23 || Boston Bruins || 2–5  || 21–22–3 ||  45 || 
|-  style="background:#cfc;"
| 47 || April 25 || New York Islanders || 1–2 || 22–22–3 ||  47 || 
|-  style="background:#cfc;"
| 48 || April 27 || @ Ottawa Senators || 2–1 || 23–22–3 ||  49 || 
|-

|-
| Legend:

Player statistics

Scoring
 Position abbreviations: C = Center; D = Defense; G = Goaltender; LW = Left Wing; RW = Right Wing
  = Joined team via a transaction (e.g., trade, waivers, signing) during the season. Stats reflect time with the Flyers only.
  = Left team via a transaction (e.g., trade, waivers, release) during the season. Stats reflect time with the Flyers only.

Goaltending
  = Joined team via a transaction (e.g., trade, waivers, signing) during the season. Stats reflect time with the Flyers only.
  = Left team via a transaction (e.g., trade, waivers, release) during the season. Stats reflect time with the Flyers only.

Awards and records

Awards

Milestones

Suspensions and fines

Transactions
The Flyers were involved in the following transactions from June 12, 2012, the day after the deciding game of the 2012 Stanley Cup Finals, through June 24, 2013, the day of the deciding game of the 2013 Stanley Cup Finals.

Trades

Players acquired

Players lost

Signings

Draft picks

Philadelphia's picks at the 2012 NHL Entry Draft, which was held at the Consol Energy Center in Pittsburgh, Pennsylvania on June 22–23, 2012. The Flyers traded their originally allotted second, third, and sixth-round picks in three different trades.

Farm teams
American Hockey League – Adirondack Phantoms
 ECHL – Trenton Titans

Notes

References
General
 
 
 
Specific

External links
 Philadelphia Flyers Historical Salaries from CapGeek.com

Philadelphia Flyers seasons
Philadelphia Flyers season, 2012-13
Phil
Philadelphia
Philadelphia